is a junction passenger railway station located in the city of Tamba, Hyōgo Prefecture, Japan, operated by West Japan Railway Company (JR West).

Lines

Station layout
The station consists of one ground-level side platform and one ground level island platform connected to the station building by a footbridge. One side of the island platform is dead headed, and is used by the Kakogawa Line. This platform is unnumbered. The station has a Midori no Madoguchi staffed ticket office.

Platforms

Adjacent stations

History
Tanikawa Station opened on May 25, 1899. With the privatization of the Japan National Railways (JNR) on April 1, 1987, the station came under the aegis of the West Japan Railway Company.

Passenger statistics
In fiscal 2016, the station was used by an average of 453 passengers daily

Surrounding area
Tamba City Kushita Elementary School

See also
List of railway stations in Japan

References

External links

 Station Official Site

Railway stations in Hyōgo Prefecture
Railway stations in Japan opened in 1899
Tamba, Hyōgo